The Redlands Bicycle Classic is a cycling stage race located in Redlands, California, United States that has been held since 1985. It consists of three road races, an individual time trial and a criterium.  It is a 5-day/5-stage race that covers approximately 350 miles. The annual event is sponsored by the city of Redlands. Men and women compete in separate categories and the field is limited to 200 entrants.

2014 is the first year that Redlands has hosted a 5th stage (and 5th day) of competition with a new circuit race added to the start of the classic stage race.

Men's winners

Women's winners

References

External links

Results and Articles Cyclingnews.com

Cycle races in the United States
Recurring sporting events established in 1985
1985 establishments in California
Cycling in California
Men's road bicycle races